Epiblema sarmatana is a species of moth of the family Tortricidae. It is found in France, Germany, Austria, Switzerland, Italy, the Czech Republic, Slovakia, Bulgaria, Romania, the Near East, Russia, Kazakhstan and China (Gansu).

The larvae feed on Chamaecytisus species.

References

Moths described in 1872
Eucosmini